The Soviet Historical Encyclopedia is the Soviet encyclopedia of the Academy of Sciences of the Soviet Union (1961–1976) on the history of peoples of the whole world until the 70s of the 20th century.

Content
Includes articles-terms on the history of the Soviet Union and foreign countries, especially on recent history. Many articles are given detailed chronologies, which are integral parts of articles devoted to the Soviet Union, Union republics and foreign countries.

Articles are accompanied by statistical tables, maps (historical, political, ethnographic), diagrams, illustrations.

Editors
Editor-in-Chief – Evgeny Zhukov.

In different years, the members of the main editorial board were:

Volumes

Sources
Soviet Historical Encyclopedia // Soviet Encyclopedia of the History of Ukraine: in 4 Volumes / Editor-in-Chief Andrey Skaba – Kiev: The Main Edition of the Ukrainian Soviet Encyclopedia, 1972 – Volume 4 – Page 130

External links
Soviet Historical Encyclopedia: In 16 Volumes – Moscow: State Scientific Publishing House "Soviet Encyclopedia", 1961–1976 // Site "Runivers"

Russian-language encyclopedias
Soviet encyclopedias